The Neomeniamorpha are one of the three taxonomic orders of solenogasters, shell-less, worm-like, marine mollusks.

It is considered an alternate representation for the class Solenogastres. 

Families and genera include:
 Hemimeniidae
 Archaeomenia
 Hemimenia
 Neomeniidae
 Neomenia

References